Mitar Martinović (Cetinje, 8 September 1870 – Belgrade, 11 February 1954) was a Montenegrin vojvoda and divisional general in the Yugoslav Royal Army. He was a short-term Prime Minister of Montenegro from 19 June 1912 to 8 May 1913, being succeeded by Serdar Janko Vukotić.

Martinović was one of the founders of the Royalist True People's Party in 1906. He was Prime Minister of the Kingdom of Montenegro between 1912 and 1913, and a Minister of the Military on two occasions (1907–1910, and 1912–1913).

References

1870 births
1954 deaths
Military personnel from Cetinje
Prime Ministers of Montenegro
19th-century military history of Montenegro
20th-century military history of Montenegro
Defence ministers of Montenegro